Black Loch is a small lowland freshwater loch that is located directly to the east of Fingask Loch in the valley of the Lunan Burn and is 1 mile south of Blairgowrie, in Perth and Kinross.

The loch is also a designated Site of Special Scientific Interest (SSSI), as well as forming part of a Special Area of Conservation.

Geography
Black Loch lies to the east of two other small lochs. Directly to the east is White Loch and further east still is Fingask Loch and all within a distance of half a mile. Part of the eastern end of White Loch and all of Black Loch are within the bounds of Blairgowrie Golf Club.

See also
 List of lochs in Scotland

References

Freshwater lochs of Scotland
Lochs of Perth and Kinross
Tay catchment
Protected areas of Perth and Kinross
Sites of Special Scientific Interest in Scotland
Conservation in the United Kingdom
Special Areas of Conservation in Scotland
Birdwatching sites in Scotland